Multisystem inflammatory syndrome may refer to:

Multisystem inflammatory syndrome in children (also known as 'paediatric multisystem inflammatory syndrome'), a rare life-threatening illness resembling Kawasaki disease that has been observed following exposure to the virus responsible for COVID-19; a similar syndrome has also been reported in adults.

Kawasaki disease, a rare disease of unknown origin that affects young children, in which blood vessels become inflamed throughout the body.
Systemic inflammatory response syndrome, inflammation affecting the whole body in response to an infectious or noninfectious insult.
Neonatal-onset multisystem inflammatory disease, a rare genetic autoinflammatory disease which causes uncontrolled systemic inflammation from early infancy.

See also
Inflammation
Multisystem disease
Syndrome

References

Inflammations